Lyle Vanclief,  (born September 19, 1943) is a former politician who served as Canada's Minister of Agriculture from 1997 to 2003.

Early life
Vanclief was born in Ameliasburg, Ontario. He graduated in the class of 1967 from the University of Guelph with a Bachelor of Agriculture degree.

Political career
Vanclief was first elected to the House of Commons of Canada as a Liberal Member of Parliament representing the rural Ontario riding of Prince Edward—Hastings in 1988.

In October 1993, Vanclief was re-elected to the 36th Canadian Parliament.

In June 1997, Vanclief was named Canadian Minister of Agriculture and Agri-Food after his election to the 36th Canadian Parliament.

Paul Martin, who had been Minister of Finance during Vanclief's tenure as Minister of Agriculture, considered him a strong supporter of Prime Minister Jean Chrétien and he was removed from the Canadian Cabinet when Martin succeeded Chrétien as Liberal leader and prime minister in 2003.

Vanclief did not run for re-election in the 2004 election.

Vanclief supported Stéphane Dion for the leadership of the Liberal Party.

Family
Vanclief married Sharon, with whom he has two children.

References

External links

1943 births
Living people
Members of the 26th Canadian Ministry
Members of the House of Commons of Canada from Ontario
Liberal Party of Canada MPs
Canadian lobbyists
Members of the King's Privy Council for Canada
University of Guelph alumni
People from Prince Edward County, Ontario